Corporate Governance: An International Review is a peer-reviewed academic journal published six times a year by Wiley. This most prestigious journal publishes international business research on comparative corporate governance, covering topics such as shareholder activism, mutual funds, regulations and shareholder rights.

The editorial mission of the journal is to learn about both the antecedents and effects of corporate governance practices, policies, and principles from an interdisciplinary conversation. Consequently, the journal publishes articles from scholars operating from a variety of disciplines, including economics, finance, law, management, sociology and political science.

Abstracting and Indexing 
Corporate Governance: An International Review is abstracted and indexed in the Social Sciences Citation Index, Scopus, ProQuest, EBSCO, and Emerald Management Reviews. According to the Journal Citation Reports, the journal has a 2018 impact factor of 3.39 ranking it 9th out 103  journals in the category "Business Finance", 46th out of 147 journals in the category "Business" and 52nd out of 217 journals in the category "Management".

20th Anniversary 
In 2012, Corporate Governance: An International Review celebrated its 20th anniversary with a commemorative conference at the Judge Business School, Cambridge University. The stated aim of the event was to “move the field closer to a global theory by advancing our understanding of national governance bundles”. The anniversary was also marked with an online issue of the journal which brought together some of the journal's most highly cited articles.

References

External links 
 

Wiley-Blackwell academic journals
English-language journals
Publications established in 1993
Business and management journals